Forest is a 2020 South Korean television series starring Park Hae-jin and Jo Bo-ah. It aired on KBS2 from January  29 to March 19, 2020.

Cast

Main
 Park Hae-jin as Kang San-hyuk
 Choi Seung-hoon as young Kang San-hyuk
 Jo Bo-ah as Jung Young-jae
 Lee Go-eun as young Jung Young-jae
 Jung Yeon-joo as Oh Bo-mi
 No Gwang-sik as Choi Chang

Recurring

119 Rescue Team
 Ryu Seung-soo as Bong Dae-yong
 Woo Jung-kook as Ki Pil-young
 Geum Kwang-san as Yang Chul-sik
 Kim Eun-soo as Gook Soon-tae
 Myung Jae-hwan as Kim Man-soo

Miryeong Hospital
 Ahn Sang-woo as Park Jin-man
 Go Soo-hee as Nurse Kim
 Lee Nam-hee as Hospital Director

Red Line Investments
 Lee Si-hoon as Park Hyung-soo
 Kim Su-hyeon as Chairman Jang
 Jung Soo-gyo as Han Ji-yong

Taeseong Group
 Choi Kwang-il as Kwon Joo-han
 Kim Young-pil as Jo Kwang-pil

Others
 Park Ji-il as Jung Byung-hyuk
 Lee Do-kyung as Choi Jung-mok
 Jung Myung-joon as Shin Joon-young
 Heo Ji-won as Cha Jin-woo
 Choi Beom-ho as Seo Seok-yong
 Kim Min-seok
 Han Chul-woo

Special appearances
 Grace Lee as Professor presenting conference materials on Bangladesh epidemic cases (episode 20)
 Jeong Moon-ho
 Kim Choong-sik

Production
 Early working title was Secret. 
 Filming finished in August 2019. Drama series airs as a completed production.

Ratings
In this table,  represent the lowest ratings and  represent the highest ratings.

Notes

References

External links
  
 
 
 

Korean Broadcasting System television dramas
Korean-language television shows
2020 South Korean television series debuts
2020 South Korean television series endings
South Korean medical television series
South Korean melodrama television series
South Korean pre-produced television series
South Korean romance television series
Television series by IHQ (company)